McComb is a surname.  According to a 2002 text, McComb is the most common derivative in Ireland of the Gaelic MacThom meaning "son of Thomas", or "son of Tom".  Another, potentially interrelated origin, places McComb as a sept of Clan Mackinnon.  A third potential origin is as a derivative of Malcolm.

Related surnames include McCombs, McComish, McCombe, McComas, McCombie and Macomber.

Following are a list of notable individuals sharing this surname:

References